Peter Michael Liba  (May 10, 1940 – June 21, 2007) was a Canadian journalist, businessman and 22nd Lieutenant Governor of Manitoba.

Biography
Liba was born in Winnipeg, and began his journalistic career working for the Portage la Prairie Daily Telegraph and the Neepawa Press.  He joined the Winnipeg Tribune in 1960, and became its city editor in 1967. An executive assistant to the leadership of the Manitoba Liberal Party between 1968 and 1973, working under Gildas Molgat, Robert Bend and Israel Asper, in 1974 he joined Asper's CanWest group of companies, eventually becoming president and CEO of CKND-TV in Manitoba and SaskWest TV in Saskatchewan. He served on the Board of Directors of Atomic Energy of Canada from 1981 to 1986 with Marc Lalonde.

In 1993 he was appointed executive vice-president of CanWest Global Communications Corp and was promoted to executive director of corporate affairs in 1997. He also served two terms as chairman of the Canadian Association of Broadcasters, and was also president of the Western Association of Broadcasters and the Broadcasters Association of Manitoba. President of his own company, Peli Ventures Inc., from 1975 he was actively involved in several social and philanthropic groups in the Winnipeg area. In 1984 Liba was appointed a member of the Order of Canada and in 1998 was inducted into the Canadian Association of Broadcasters Hall of Fame.

The appointment as Manitoba's lieutenant-governor may have been, in part, a reflection of Canadian prime minister Jean Chrétien's friendship with Israel Asper.  The position is largely ceremonial, and Liba had very little influence over the governments of Gary Filmon and Gary Doer. Liba was made the first member of the Order of Manitoba in 1999, and received the Queen Elizabeth II's Golden Jubilee Medal in 2004.  He stepped down as lieutenant-governor just before the federal election of 2004, and was replaced by outgoing Liberal MP John Harvard.

Liba died on June 21, 2007 at his cottage at Lake of the Woods.

References

Arms

External links
Order of Canada Citation
Obituary from CBC Manitoba

1940 births
2007 deaths
Lieutenant Governors of Manitoba
Members of the Order of Canada
Members of the Order of Manitoba
People from Winnipeg
Canadian people of Ukrainian descent
21st-century Canadian politicians